Adrian Joseph Caillouet (February 19, 1883 – December 19, 1946) was a United States district judge of the United States District Court for the Eastern District of Louisiana.

Education and career

Born in Thibodaux, Louisiana, Caillouet received an Artium Baccalaureus degree from St. Mary's College in Kentucky in 1902 and read law in 1913. He was in private practice in Houma, Louisiana from 1913 to 1940.

Federal judicial service

On April 2, 1940, Caillouet was nominated by President Franklin D. Roosevelt to a new seat on the United States District Court for the Eastern District of Louisiana created by 52 Stat. 110. He was confirmed by the United States Senate on April 9, 1940, and received his commission on April 23, 1940, serving until his death on December 19, 1946.

References

Sources
 

1883 births
1946 deaths
Judges of the United States District Court for the Eastern District of Louisiana
United States district court judges appointed by Franklin D. Roosevelt
20th-century American judges
People from Thibodaux, Louisiana
United States federal judges admitted to the practice of law by reading law